Jeffrey Dexter Francis Vandersay (born 5 February 1990) is a professional Sri Lankan cricketer. He is a past student of Wesley College, Colombo.

Domestic career
In March 2018, he was named in Dambulla's squad for the 2017–18 Super Four Provincial Tournament. The following month, he was also named in Dambulla's squad for the 2018 Super Provincial One Day Tournament.

In August 2018, he was named in Galle's squad the 2018 SLC T20 League. In March 2019, he was named in Kandy's squad for the 2019 Super Provincial One Day Tournament. In October 2020, he was drafted by the Colombo Kings for the inaugural edition of the Lanka Premier League.

In March 2021, he was part of the Sinhalese Sports Club team that won the 2020–21 SLC Twenty20 Tournament, the first time they had won the tournament since 2005. In July 2022, he was signed by the Colombo Stars for the third edition of the Lanka Premier League.

International career
He played in the tour match between SLCB President's XI and Pakistanis in June 2015. He made his Twenty20 International debut for Sri Lanka against Pakistan on 30 July 2015. He was unable to take a wicket and finished with figures of 25 runs from 4 overs.

Vandersay made his One Day International (ODI) debut for Sri Lanka against New Zealand on 28 December 2015 as the 168th ODI player for Sri Lanka. He scored 7 runs not out in his first ODI innings, but in bowling, he was severely hit by Martin Guptill and in the end Vandersey conceded 34 runs in 2 overs. Sri Lanka lost the match by 10 wickets. However, his first ODI wicket came during the 3rd ODI at Saxton Oval, when he dismissed Tom Latham for 42 runs. He took his first Twenty20 International wicket by dismissing Corey Anderson in the first Twenty20 International against New Zealand at Bay Oval. Vandersay was originally included in the 2016 ICC World Twenty20 Sri Lanka squad, but due to poor performances in New Zealand and Pakistan tours, he was dropped from the world cup squad. He was later re-added to the squad after Lasith Malinga was ruled out with an injury.

In January 2017, he was added to Sri Lanka's ODI squad for their series against South Africa. In November 2017, he was added to Sri Lanka's Test squad, replacing Rangana Herath, ahead of the third Test against India, but he did not play. In May 2018, he was named in Sri Lanka's Test squad for their series against the West Indies. He did not play in any matches, and ahead of the third and final Test of the series, he was sent home due to conduct issues.

In May 2018, he was one of 33 cricketers to be awarded a national contract by Sri Lanka Cricket ahead of the 2018–19 season. In December 2018, he was named in Sri Lanka team for the 2018 ACC Emerging Teams Asia Cup. On 23 June 2018, Vandersay was sent home by Sri Lanka Cricket (SLC) after a breach of his player contract regarding disciplinary issues.  He was in the Caribbean at that time, but did not play any matches. During the press release, SLC reported an "incident" following which this decision. The following month, he was handed a one-year suspended sentence and a 20% fine of his annual contract.

In April 2019, he was named in Sri Lanka's squad for the 2019 Cricket World Cup. In February 2022, he was named in Sri Lanka's Test squad for their series against India. In June 2022, he was named in the Sri Lanka A squad for their matches against Australia A during Australia's tour of Sri Lanka. Later the same month, he was named in Sri Lanka's Test squad, also for their home series against Australia. He made his Test debut on 29 June 2022, for Sri Lanka against Australia. However he was dropped from the squad after testing positive for COVID-19.

References

External links
 

1990 births
Living people
Sri Lankan cricketers
Sri Lanka Test cricketers
Sri Lanka One Day International cricketers
Sri Lanka Twenty20 International cricketers
People from Western Province, Sri Lanka
Burgher sportspeople
Galle Guardians cricketers
Kandy District cricketers
Cricketers at the 2019 Cricket World Cup
Colombo Stars cricketers